The 2023 Laurence Olivier Awards are scheduled to be held on 2 April 2023 at the Royal Albert Hall and hosted by Hannah Waddingham.

Event calendar 
12 October 2022: Ceremony date set for 2 April 2023 and venue confirmed as the Royal Albert Hall.
17 January: Hannah Waddingham announced as ceremony host.
28 February: Nominations announcement by Gabrielle Brooks and Amber Davies.
24 March: Special Recognition Award recipients announced as Derek Jacobi and Arlene Phillips.
2 April: Award ceremony to be held

Winners and nominees
The nominations were announced in 26 categories on 28 February 2023.

Productions with multiple nominations

Multiple nominations
The following 17 productions and 2 operas received multiple nominations:

9: My Neighbour Totoro
8: Standing at the Sky's Edge
7: Oklahoma!
6: A Streetcar Named Desire, The Band's Visit, To Kill a Mockingbird
5: Prima Facie4: Good, Tammy Faye3: Blues for an Alabama Sky, Jack and the Beanstalk, Patriots, Sylvia2: Alcina, The Crucible, For Black Boys Who Have Considered Suicide When the Hue Gets Too Heavy, Sibyl, Sister Act, South Pacific''

See also
76th Tony Awards

References

External links
Olivier Awards official website

Laurence Olivier Awards
Laurence Olivier Awards ceremonies
2023 in London
April 2023 events in the United Kingdom
Events at the Royal Albert Hall